Lamidanda Airport  is a domestic airport located in Lamidanda, Rawabesi, serving Khotang District, a district in Province No. 1 in Nepal. According to the Civil Aviation Authority of Nepal, it is the gateway to the Halesi-Maratika Caves. Status: Not Active

Facilities

Airlines and destinations

Accidents and incidents
On 15 December 2010, a Tara Air flight operated by DHC-6 Twin Otter crashed into a mountain shortly after departure. The aircraft was operating a chartered passenger flight to Tribhuvan International Airport, Kathmandu, Nepal. All 19 passengers and crew were killed.

References

External links
 

Airports in Nepal
Buildings and structures in Khotang District